Bukhari, also spelled as Bokhari, Bukhary and Bukhori, is a common surname in South Asia and in the Muslim world, meaning "from Bukhara" (a Persian.speaking-majority city in today's Uzbekistan).

Its Arabic version is al-Bukhari

Males

Makhdoom Jalaluddin Surkh-Posh Bukhari (Naqvi/Naqawi Al Bukhari) (1199–1291), 13th century Naqvi Sufi saint and missionary settled in Uch, Bahawalpur, Pakistan. (founding father of Naqvi Al Bukhari not to be confused with Naqvi Al Bhakkari founded by his paternal 3rd cousin).
Makhdoom Jahaniyan Jahangasht 13th century scholar, successor and paternal grandson of Jalaluddin Surkh-Posh Bukhari (Naqvi/Naqawi Al Bukhari)
al-Bukhari (810–870), editor of Sahih al-Bukhari, the book of Hadith
Abu Ishaq al-Saffar al-Bukhari (1067–1139), Hanafi-Maturidi scholar
Shah Jewna or Hazrat Pir Shah Jewna Al-Naqvi Al-Bukhari, famous saint of Kannauj and a paternal descedant of Jalaluddin Surkh-Posh Bukhari through Sadruddin Rajan Qatal Naqvi Al Bukhari.
Jamal ad-Din Muḥammad ibn Ṭāhir ibn Muḥammad al‐Zaydī al‐Bukhārī, (13th-century) Persian-speaking Muslim astronomer
Baha-ud-Din Naqshband Bukhari (1318–1389), founder of the Naqshbandi tariqa
'Ala' al-Din al-Bukhari (1377–1438), Hanafi-Maturidi scholar
Pir Haji Ali Shah Bukhari, 14th century Sufi saint
Kirom Bukhoroi, 18th century Tajik  poet
Syed Ata Ullah Shah Bukhari (1892–1961), Muslim scholar and orator
Patras Bokhari (1898–1958), Pakistani humorist and diplomat
Zulfiqar Ali Bukhari (1904–1975), Urdu broadcaster and first director-general of Radio Pakistan
Lal Bokhari (1909–1959), Indian field hockey player
Abdul Halim Bukhari (1945–2022), Bangladeshi Islamic scholar
Naeem Bokhari (born 1948), Pakistani lawyer and television personality
Syed Mokhtar Albukhary (born 1951), Malaysian businessman
Nayyar Hussain Bukhari (born 1952), Pakistani politician
Shahid Hussain Bokhari (born 1952), Pakistani computer scientist
Syed Faisal Bukhari (born 1963), Pakistani film and television director, producer, and cinematographer
Syed Iftikhar Bokhari (1935–2021), Pakistani politician and cricketer
Nourdin Boukhari (born 1980), Dutch-born Moroccan footballer
Mudassar Bukhari (born 1983), Pakistani-born Dutch cricketer
Admiral Fasih Bokhari, Chief of Naval Staff of the Pakistani Navy
Asghar Bukhari, founding member of the Muslim Public Affairs Committee UK
Fida Hussain Bukhari, Pakistani religious scholar
Ahmed Bukhari, Imam of Delhi's Jama Masjid

Females
 Samra Bukhari, Pakistani novelist

The Bokhary family of Hong Kong
Daoud Bokhary (born c. 1919), Hong Kong businessman
Kemal Bokhary (born 1947), Hong Kong judge

References

Arabic-language surnames
Persian-language surnames
Nisbas
Urdu-language surnames